Sérgio Fernando da Silva Rodrigues (born 12 October 1985), commonly known as Serginho, is a Portuguese footballer who plays as a left back for Lusitânia FC.

Club career
Born in Castelo de Paiva, Aveiro District, Serginho played almost exclusively in the second division in his country, representing C.D. Feirense, S.C. Freamunde and C.D. Santa Clara. Abroad, he started appearing for Cyprus' Ermis Aradippou FC and FC Brașov in Romania.

In February 2015, Serginho signed a one-and-a-half-year contract with FC Dinamo București. He left after only four months, however, returning to both his country and Feirense.

In the summer of 2016, Serginho joined French club US Créteil-Lusitanos. He was released the following transfer window.

References

External links

1985 births
Living people
People from Castelo de Paiva
Portuguese footballers
Association football defenders
Liga Portugal 2 players
Campeonato de Portugal (league) players
C.D. Feirense players
S.C. Freamunde players
C.D. Santa Clara players
A.D. Sanjoanense players
Lusitânia F.C. players
Cypriot First Division players
Ermis Aradippou FC players
Liga I players
FC Brașov (1936) players
FC Dinamo București players
Championnat National players
US Créteil-Lusitanos players
Portuguese expatriate footballers
Expatriate footballers in Cyprus
Expatriate footballers in Romania
Expatriate footballers in France
Portuguese expatriate sportspeople in Cyprus
Portuguese expatriate sportspeople in Romania
Portuguese expatriate sportspeople in France
Sportspeople from Aveiro District